Paisley South may refer to:

 Paisley South (UK Parliament constituency)
 Paisley South (Scottish Parliament constituency)